Chronology is the science of locating events in time.

A chronology is a common term for a timeline.

It can also mean:

Chronology (Bryn Haworth album), a 1989 release
Chronology (Dom and Roland album), a 2004 release 
Chronology (Chronixx album), a 2017 release
Chronology, a 1997 compilation by Buzzcocks
Chronology Volume 1, a 2007 album by Christian rock band Third Day
Chronology Volume 2, a 2007 album by Christian rock band Third Day
"Chronology", a composition from Ornette Coleman's The Shape of Jazz to Come
Chronology (video game), a 2014 puzzle-platform game

See also
Chronometry
Horology, the study of time
Timeline (disambiguation)